Ellen V. Rothenberg (born 1952) is an American biologist who is a Distinguished Professor at the California Institute of Technology. She investigates the molecular mechanisms that underpin lineage choice. She is an elected fellow of the American Association for the Advancement of Science, American Academy of Arts and Sciences and the National Academy of Sciences.

Early life and education
Rothenberg describes her upbringing as "sex-blind". She credits her parents with giving her "this heroic sense of one's potential" and says her father  "taught [her] advanced math and logic to the point that [she] got in trouble with [her] teachers". As a child, Rothenberg originally wanted to become a physicist, but her high school biology classes inspired her to pursue biochemistry. Her high school teachers taught her about protein structure and how their structures confer biological function. While Rothenberg was an undergraduate student at Harvard University, her tutor, Boris Magasanik, inspired her to work on gene regulation. After earning her bachelor's degree, Rothenberg started a MD–PhD program offered jointly by Harvard Medical School and the Massachusetts Institute of Technology (MIT). She eventually dropped the MD but continued, at MIT, her PhD research with David Baltimore. She was the first to synthesize in vitro the genome of a retrovirus. She completed her doctoral research in the Department of Biology and Center for Cancer Research in 1977. Rothenberg was a Jane Coffin Childs postdoctoral fellow with Edward Boyse at the Memorial Sloan Kettering Cancer Center in New York City.

Research and career 
In 1979, Rothenberg was appointed to the faculty at the Salk Institute for Biological Studies, where she spent three years before moving to the California Institute of Technology. Rothenberg investigates the molecular mechanisms that underpin lineage selection. This includes the processes that determine the differentiation of hematopoietic stem cells into T cells. There are several steps to this process, in which the multi-potentiality of stem cells are reduced whilst the T-cell specific differentiation events start.

Rothenberg studies the transcription factors that induce gene expression of T-lineages. She identified that subtle changes in these pathways can predispose autoimmunity.

Awards and honors 
 2014 American Association of Immunologists Distinguished Lecturer
 2016 California Institute of Technology Richard P. Feynman Prize for Excellence in Teaching
 2017 Elected Fellow of the American Association for the Advancement of Science
 2018 Elected Fellow of the American Academy of Arts and Sciences
 2021 Elected Member of the National Academy of Sciences

Selected publications 
 
 
 
Long Li; Mark Leid; Ellen V Rothenberg. (2 July 2010). An Early T Cell Lineage Commitment Checkpoint Dependent on the Transcription Factor Bcl11b Science; Vol. 329; No. 5987; https://doi.org/10.1126/science.1188989.   PMC 2935300. PMID 20595614.
Jingli A Zhang; Ali Mortazavi; Brian A Williams; Barbara J Wold; Ellen V Rothenberg (13 April 2012). Dynamic Transformations of Genome-wide Epigenetic Marking and Transcriptional Control Establish T Cell Identity Cell; Vol. 149; No. 2; https://doi.org/10.1016/j.cell.2012.01.056.  PMID 22500808. PMC 3336965.
Hao Yuan Kueh; Ameya Champhekhar; Stephen L Nutt; Michael B Elowitz; Ellen V Rothenberg (9 August 2013). Positive Feedback Between PU.1 and the Cell Cycle Controls Myeloid Differentiation Science; Vol. 341; No. 6146; https://doi.org/10.1126/science.1240831. PMID 23868921. PMC 3913367.

References 

California Institute of Technology faculty
Harvard College alumni
Massachusetts Institute of Technology alumni
American women biologists
Fellows of the American Academy of Arts and Sciences
Members of the United States National Academy of Sciences
Fellows of the American Association for the Advancement of Science
1952 births
Living people
21st-century American women scientists
20th-century American women scientists
21st-century American biologists
20th-century American biologists